"No Hard Feelings" is a song by American country music band Old Dominion. It was released in December 2021 as the second single from their 2021 album Time, Tequila & Therapy.

Content
The song is about a man recovering from a breakup. He describes his attempts to recover with the phrase "time, tequila, and therapy", which provided the album's title. All five band members wrote the song with Shane McAnally, with whom they also produced it. Lead singer Matthew Ramsey described the song as "a serious song, but it does have a little bit of an uplifting quality to it".

Charts

Weekly charts

Year-end charts

References

2021 singles
2021 songs
Old Dominion (band) songs
Songs written by Shane McAnally
Songs written by Matthew Ramsey
Song recordings produced by Shane McAnally
Arista Nashville singles
Songs written by Brad Tursi
Songs written by Trevor Rosen